The Capalaba Bus Station, at Capalaba, Queensland, is serviced by TransLink bus routes. It is part of the Capalaba Shopping Precinct and is the primary interchange for TransLink's Eastern Region. It is in Zone 2 of the TransLink integrated public transport system.

The Interchange is laid out in square island with platforms (A-D) on each side surrounding landscaping work, community art pieces, shelters and an amenities block. Each platform can accommodate two buses and on the opposite side of Platforms A and B is parking for up to six buses. A fifth platform (E) is located on the opposite side of Redland Bay Road and it services morning express routes and some school services.

Services 

Capalaba Bus Station is serviced by Transdev Queensland and Mt Gravatt Bus Service. Following is a list of the public routes using the station:
240, 241, 260, 262, 263, 264, 266, N250, 250, 251, 252, 254, 270, 275, 273

References

Bus stations in South East Queensland
Public transport in Brisbane
Capalaba, Queensland
Buildings and structures in Redland City